Airline chicken is a food dish composed of a boneless chicken breast with the drumette attached. The breast is skin-on, and the first wing joint and tendon are attached while the rest of the breast is boneless. The cut is also known as a frenched breast, due to the end of the wing bone getting trimmed. It is also known as statler chicken, a name that originated from the Statler Hotel Boston, built in 1927 by E.M. Statler.

See also

 List of chicken dishes

References

American chicken dishes